Leandro Gallerano (fl. 1615–1632) was an Italian composer.

His works include a Missa Defunctorum for five voices and basso continuo (1615).

References

Italian male classical composers
Italian Baroque composers
17th-century Italian composers
17th-century male musicians